Anton Dif Bernolák; ; 3 October 1762 – 15 January 1813) was a Slovak linguist and Catholic priest, and the author of the first Slovak language standard.

Life
He was born as the second child to a lower noble family in the Árva region. He studied at a grammar school (gymnasium) in Rózsahegy from 1774 to 1778, and later in Nagyszombat and Vienna, and graduated in theology at the general seminary in Pressburg (present-day Bratislava) in 1787. In the very same year, he codified the first Slovak language standard, which he based on western Slovak dialects spoken around Nagyszombat, with some elements from the central dialects. The language, called bernolákovčina, wasn't accepted as a national standard language, although it was a milestone on the way to the formation of the modern Slovak nation. From 1787 to 1791, he was a curate in Cseklész (present-day Bernolákovo), from 1791 to 1797 a secretary in the archbishopric vicar's office in Nagyszombat (present-day Trnava), and from 1797 until his death in 1813, a priest in Érsekújvár (present-day Nové Zámky).

His language was the basis for the activities of the Slovak Educated Brotherhood, established in 1787 in Nagyszombat (present-day Trnava), and also for the movement of Bernolák's followers, which lasted three generations. Exhaustive literary and priestly work, concern about his close family and other circumstances undermined his health to such an extent that he died unexpectedly of a heart attack on January 15, 1813.

Works
 1782
 Divux rex Stephanus, magnus Hungarorum apostolus
 1787
 Dissertatio-critica de litteris Slavorum
 1787
 Linguae Slavonicae… compendiosa simul et facilis Orthographia
 1790
 Grammatica Slavica (Slovak Grammar)
 1791
 Etymologia vocum slavicarum (Etymology of Slavic words)
 1825 / 1827
 Slowár Slowenskí, Češko-Laťinsko-Ňemecko-Uherskí (A Slovak, Czech-Latin-German-Hungarian Dictionary), a six-volume dictionary, supposed to be a vocabulary manual of the literary language, published after Bernolák's death in Buda by canon Juraj Palkovič

Works online 
 Slowár Slowenskí Češko-Laťinsko-Ňemecko-Uherskí (scan)
 Ešče ňečo o epigrammatéch, anebožto málorádkoch M. W. P. Jozefa Bajza…" (Vidané v Poli elízíském teho roku 1794). 15 p. - available at ULB´s Digital Library
 Ňečo o epigrammatéch...  vydané v Žiline r. 1794. 36 p. - available at ULB´s Digital Library
 ŽAŠKOVKÝ, F. Manuale Musico-Liturgicum in usum Ecclesiarum Cathedralium et Ruralium ...'' Agriae: Typ. Lycei Archi-Episcopalis, 1853. 254 p. - available at ULB´s Digital Library - Bernolak edited the slovak text of the songs according to the Slovak language standards

See also
Anton Bernolák's Chapel

External links
 Anton Bernolák

1762 births
1813 deaths
People from Námestovo
People from the Kingdom of Hungary
Slovak nobility
Slovak Roman Catholic priests
Linguists from Slovakia
18th-century Slovak people
19th-century Slovak people
18th-century linguists
19th-century linguists
Language regulators